Gilda Cruz-Romo (née Gilda Cruz, born February 12, 1940) is a Mexican operatic soprano, particularly associated with dramatic roles 
of the Italian repertory, notably Aida and Tosca.

Born in Guadalajara, Jalisco, she studied at the Mexico City Conservatory with Angel Esquivel. She made her debut in Mexico City, as Ortlinde in Die Walküre, in 1962.

Her international career took off with her debut at the New York City Opera in 1969, as Margherita in Mefistofele, opposite Norman Treigle. The following year, on December 18, 1970, she made her debut at the Metropolitan Opera in New York, as Cio-Cio-San in Madama Butterfly, and remained at the Met until 1984. Her roles there included; Nedda, Violetta, Manon Lescaut, Suor Angelica, Tosca, Aida, Elisabeth de Valois, Desdemona, Amelia, both Verdi's Leonoras, from Il trovatore and La forza del destino. She also appeared at the opera houses of Chicago, Houston, Dallas, San Francisco, New Orleans, Boston, Philadelphia, Baltimore, etc.

She also appeared in Europe, making her debut at the Royal Opera House in London in 1972, and La Scala in Milan in 1973, both as Aida. She scored a triumph as Luisa Miller in 1974, in a live performance with the RAI Torino, opposite Luciano Pavarotti, and conducted by Peter Maag. She sang at the Verona Arena, the Rome Opera, La Fenice in Venice, the Maggio Musicale Fiorentino in Florence, etc.

In 1973, she also made her debut at the Vienna State Opera, as Cio-Cio san, also singing in La forza del destino, Luisa Miller,Tosca, and Aida. She also appeared at the Bolshoi in Moscow, the Liceo in Barcelona, the Teatro Nacional Sao Carlos in Lisbon, and the Palais Garnier in Paris.  Her Desdemona was seen in a "Live from the Met" telecast of Otello in 1979, with Plácido Domingo in the title role.

During the 1988-89 season, she added the role of Cherubini's Medea to her repertory, and sang the role of Matilde in the American premiere of Mascagni's Silvano, at the New Jersey Opera.

Cruz-Romo has been very active in concert and recital as well. She did not make any commercial recordings but can be heard in a few live-performance recordings of her best roles.

Selected recordings

 Verdi - Luisa Miller - Gilda Cruz-Romo, Luciano Pavarotti, Cristina Angelakova, Matteo Manuguerra, Raffaele Arié, Ferruccio Mazzoli - Coro e Orchestra della Rai Torino, Peter Maag.
 Verdi - Il trovatore - Carlo Cossutta, Gilda Cruz-Romo, Fiorenza Cossotto, Matteo Manuguerra,  - Coro e Orchestra del Maggio Musicale Fiorentino, Riccardo Muti.

Sources
 The Metropolitan Opera Encyclopedia, edited by David Hamilton, (Simon & Schuster, 1987)

External links
Biography of Gilda Cruz-Romo
 , with Susanne Marsee, 1981.

1940 births
Mexican operatic sopranos
Singers from Guadalajara, Jalisco
Living people
Mexican expatriates in the United States
20th-century Mexican women opera singers